Francis Bassett (25 May 1820 – 9 June 1899) was a British Liberal politician.

His father John Dollin Bassett was partner in a bank at Leighton Buzzard, of which Francis and his brother also became partners. He was elected MP for Bedfordshire at a by-election in 1872 but resigned in 1875.

References

External links
 

UK MPs 1868–1874
UK MPs 1874–1880
1820 births
1899 deaths
Liberal Party (UK) MPs for English constituencies